Landeh District is a district (bakhsh) in Kohgiluyeh County, Kohgiluyeh and Boyer-Ahmad Province, Iran. At the 2006 census, its population was 21,151, in 3,973 families.  The District has one city: Landeh. The District has two rural districts (dehestan): Olya Tayeb Rural District and Tayebi-ye Garmsiri-ye Shomali Rural District.

References 

Districts of Kohgiluyeh and Boyer-Ahmad Province
Kohgiluyeh County